The Wolseley 4/44 is an automobile which was introduced by the British Motor Corporation in 1952 and manufactured from 1953 until 1956. It was designed under the Nuffield Organization but by the time it was released, Wolseley was part of BMC. Much of the design was shared with the MG Magnette ZA which was released later in the same year.

Unlike the MG, the 4/44 used the  XPAW engine a version of the XPAG engine previously seen in the later MG T-type series of cars but detuned by only having a single carburettor. The four-speed manual transmission had a column change.

The construction was monocoque with independent suspension at the front by coil springs and a live rear axle.

The car had upmarket trim with wooden dashboard and leather seats and a traditional Wolseley radiator grille with illuminated badge but was expensive at GBP997 on the home market.

The 4/44 was replaced in 1956 by the similar Wolseley 15/50.

References

4 44
Cars introduced in 1952
Sports sedans
Compact executive cars
Rear-wheel-drive vehicles